MAD protein is a protein that in humans is encoded by the MXD1 gene.

MAD-MAX dimerization protein belongs to a subfamily of MAX-interacting proteins. This protein competes with MYC for binding to MAX to form a sequence-specific DNA-binding complex, acts as a transcriptional repressor (while MYC appears to function as an activator) and is a candidate tumor suppressor.

Interactions
MXD1 has been shown to interact with Histone deacetylase 2, SMC3, MLX, SIN3A and MAX.

References

Further reading

External links